Hon. William Lithgow (c. 1715 – December 20, 1798) was a judge for the Court of Common Pleas of Lincoln County, when Maine was under the jurisdiction of the Province of Massachusetts Bay. Lithgow also served in the Massachusetts Bay Colonial Militia for twenty years before and during the French and Indian War.

Biography

William Lithgow's family, emigrated from Derry, Ireland, to Boston on the ship "Olive", chartered by Robert Temple. William was just three years old when he and his family came to the Americas. From Boston, the Lithgows traveled north to present day Maine, at the mouth of the Kennebec River near Merrymeeting Bay, where William's father, Robert, prospected land in Topsham territory around 1720. However, due to incessant Indian attacks, the Lithgow family was forced to flee, seeking refuge at Fort George in Brunswick, about four miles distance.

Like his father, William joined the Massachusetts Bay Colonial Militia when he was about 19. He was attached to the garrison of Fort George, and then promoted to command Fort Richmond on the Kennebec.

In 1746, Lithgow settled in Georgetown, where he married Sarah Noble, the daughter of Lt. Col. Arthur Noble, who fought to the death against the French Canadians at the Battle of Grand Pre in Nova Scotia.

In 1748-54 was in command at Fort Richmond, Lithgow was commission Colonel and in 1754 was appointed by Gov. William Shirley to command the garrison at Fort Halifax, established near the junction of the Sebasticook and Kennebec Rivers. In 1752, the local Indians reported, "Capt. Lithgow of Richmond is a good-natured and faithful Man in his posts:  He takes a tender care of our young men when they are drunk, and rude to him."

After a few years, Lithgow became a justice of the peace and then appointed as a judge for the court of Common Pleas, in Lincoln County. He died December 20, 1798 and it was spoken of him that "he was a cultivated and courteous gentleman, as well as an energetic and faithful officer."

See also
 Massachusetts National Guard
 Seven Years' War

Sources
 Descendants of John Bridge, by William Frederick Bridge, 1884
  "The New York Genealogical and Biographical Record" Vol.XXIX, 1898, The Lithgow Family
 The Maine historical and genealogical recorder, Volume 7, By Stephen Marion Watson, 1893, p. 236
 Maine and its role in American art, 1740-1963 By Gertrud A. Mellon, 1963

References

People from County Londonderry
1715 births
1798 deaths
Kingdom of Ireland emigrants to the Thirteen Colonies
People of Massachusetts in the French and Indian War
People of Maine in the French and Indian War
People of colonial Maine
People of colonial Massachusetts
People of British North America
People of Maine in the American Revolution
People from Lincoln County, Maine
People of pre-statehood Maine
American judges
People from Georgetown, Maine